Jeff Bova (born Jeffrey Bova in 1953) is an American musician. He has been active in the music industry since the mid-1970s, contributing to recordings by significant mainstream artists like Celine Dion, Michael Jackson, Blondie, Eric Clapton, Joe Cocker, Cyndi Lauper, Bill Laswell and Herbie Hancock, Bernard Edwards and Tony Thompson, Meat Loaf, Missing Persons, Iron Maiden and Billy Joel among others.

Early life
Born in Washington D.C., he grew up in Old Greenwich, Connecticut. Being the son of a professional trumpet player, he took the instrument up for himself during elementary school and continued with it at the Berklee College of Music and the Manhattan School of Music. Although he also had arranging and composition lessons by trumpet legend Maury Deutsch, he would choose to specialize in keyboards instead. After leaving college he participated in a Connecticut-based jazz fusion band called "Flying Island" and later on he moved back to New York to find a place into the R&B group Change (from 1982 to 1984).

Career

1980s
In 1983, and after having worked with Nona Hendryx, he met avant-garde bassist and record producer Bill Laswell, who was set to produce Herbie Hancock's Future Shock (the first part of the latter's "techno-funk" trilogy). The tour in support of that album found Bova on Hancock's live band, as he was proficient in the ARP Chroma (a much heard instrument on Future Shock). He would work with him for the next five years, contributing to the recordings of the final part of the trilogy (Perfect Machine), while he also programmed and composed tracks for several of the soundtracks Hancock has been working on, including that of the Sean Penn film Colours. Soon after, he started working on numerous projects that were held in the Power Station and eventually obtained a room of his own there (courtesy of the studio's owners Tony Bongiovi and Bob Walters). In 1987, fellow Power Station "resident", bassist Bernard Edwards (of Chic), formed the rock-funk supergroup Distance, with Bova on keyboards, Tony Thompson (also of Chic) on drums, future Bad Company member Robert Hart on lead vocals and Eddie Martinez on guitars. They released only one album, Under the One Sky (1989) on Reprise Records, which failed to chart.

1990s
During the 1990s, Bova achieved great commercial success as a producer of Celine Dion's Grammy Award-winning album Falling into You. He also played Hammond organ and synthesizers with Meat Loaf on Bat Out of Hell II: Back into Hell. "Back Into Hell", an instrumental track off of Bat Out of Hell II: Back into Hell, was arranged and performed entirely by him, while "Fiesta De Las Almas Perdidas", a short song also written by Bova, was featured in Meat Loaf's 1995 album Welcome to the Neighborhood.

Partial discography
Partial Jeff Bova's discography, as a keyboardist, composer, arranger and producer:
Visions – Bunky Green (Vanguard, 1978)
 Riptide - Robert Palmer, 1985
 Starpeace - Yoko Ono, 1985
 True Colors - Cyndi Lauper, 1986
 Eat 'Em and Smile - David Lee Roth, 1986
 The Bridge - Billy Joel, 1986
 Color in Your Life - Missing Persons, 1986
 Hearts In Motion - Air Supply, 1986
 Floodland - The Sisters of Mercy, 1987
 Perfect Machine - Herbie Hancock, 1988
 Instinct - Iggy Pop, 1988
 Ooh Yeah! - Hall & Oates, 1988
 Original Sin - Pandora's Box, 1989
 A Night to Remember - Cyndi Lauper, 1989
 Jody Watley - Jody Watley, 1989
 Under the One Sky - Distance, 1989
 Journeyman - Eric Clapton, 1989
 Stranger in This Town - Richie Sambora, 1991
 Bat Out of Hell II: Back into Hell - Meat Loaf, 1993
 Blink of an Eye - Michael McDonald, 1993
 HIStory - Michael Jackson, 1995
 Welcome to the Neighborhood - Meat Loaf, 1995
 Falling into You - Celine Dion, 1996
 Stories Told & Untold - Bad Company, 1996
 In Deep - Tina Arena, 1997
 Brave New World - Iron Maiden, 2000
 Talk to Me - Joe McIntyre, 2006
 Bag of Bones - Europe, 2012
 Opus - Jane Badler, 2014
 The Book of Souls - Iron Maiden, 2015
 Gracia - Mari Hamada, 2018
 Soar'' - Mari Hamada, 2023

Notes
"Jeff Bova Website"
"Mix" interview

External links
Change biography
Interview

Living people
1953 births
American keyboardists
American male composers
21st-century American composers
Record producers from Washington, D.C.
Record producers from Connecticut
Musicians from Washington, D.C.
Grammy Award winners
People from Old Greenwich, Connecticut
21st-century American male musicians
Change (band) members